The 1911 U.S. National Championships (now known as the US Open) took place on the outdoor grass courts at the Newport Casino in Newport, United States. The men's singles tournament ran from 21 August until 3 September while the women's singles and doubles championship took place from 12 June to 17 June at the Philadelphia Cricket Club in Chestnut Hill. It was the 31st staging of the U.S. National Championships, and the second Grand Slam tennis event of the year. William Larned won the men's singles championship for a record seventh and final time.

Finals

Men's singles

 William Larned (USA) defeated  Maurice McLoughlin (USA) 6–4, 6–4, 6–2

Women's singles

 Hazel Hotchkiss (USA) defeated  Florence Sutton (USA) 8–10, 6–1, 9–7

Men's doubles
 Raymond Little (USA) /  Gustav Touchard (USA) defeated  Fred Alexander (USA) /  Harold Hackett (USA) 7–5, 13–15, 6–2, 6–4

Women's doubles
 Hazel Hotchkiss (USA) /  Eleonora Sears (USA) defeated  Dorothy Green (USA) /  Florence Sutton (USA) 6–4, 4–6, 6–2

Mixed doubles
 Hazel Hotchkiss (USA) /  Wallace F. Johnson (USA) defeated  Edna Wildey (USA) /  Herbert M. Tilden (USA) 6–4, 6–4

References

External links
Official US Open website

 
U.S. National Championships
U.S. National Championships (tennis) by year
U.S. National Championships
U.S. National Championships (tennis)
U.S. National Championships (tennis)
U.S. National Championships (tennis)
U.S. National Championships (tennis)
U.S. National Championships (tennis)